Timeless is a steampunk paranormal romance novel by Gail Carriger. Released on February 28, 2012, by Orbit Books, Timeless is the fifth and final book in the New York Times best-selling "The Parasol Protectorate" series, each featuring Alexia Tarabotti, a woman without a soul, as its lead character.

Plot
Blending steampunk with urban fantasy, Timeless is set in an alternate history version of Victorian era Britain where vampires and werewolfs are welcomed as members of society, often in the upper class.  The protagonist of the novel is Alexia Tarabotti, the Lady Maccon, who is "soulless", and thus unaffected by the powers of supernatural beings.

Two years have passed peacefully, or as peacefully can be expected in a household with an alpha werewolf husband and a toddler who is apt to turn hairy at inconvenient moments. The peace ends abruptly when Alexia is summoned to Alexandria to face their ancient vampire queen. Now everyone in Alexia's sphere – human, supernatural, or dead; in London, Scotland, or Egypt – must solve the mystery of the God-Breaker Plague.

Publication history
2012, USA, Orbit Books , Pub date 28 February 2012, Paperback
2012, UK, Orbit Books , Pub date 1 March 2012, Paperback

As with the first four novels in the series, this cover was designed by Lauren Panepinto and the model on the cover is Donna Ricci. The original photographs of Ricci for this cover were taken by Pixie Vision Productions.

While the author's official website lists French, German, and Thai translated editions of this novel to be released in the near future, no specific publication dates have yet been announced for any non-English language editions of Timeless.

References

External links
Gail Carriger's official site

2012 American novels
Novels by Gail Carriger
American steampunk novels
American alternate history novels
Paranormal romance novels
Novels set in Victorian England
American romance novels
Orbit Books books